Brenton Harold Turner, aka Jack Turner, (September 24, 1889 – October 6, 1989) was a Canadian war photographer.

Life
Turner was a soldier with the 2nd Canadian Siege Battery during the First World War. While in Europe he smuggled a German-built  format camera with him and took approximately 99 photographs from the war zone.

After the war, Turner returned to Prince Edward Island, married and took up farming in Knutsford. He died 6 October, 1989 at 100 years of age.

References

External links
A biography and images on a Government of Canada website (via Wayback Machine).

1889 births
1989 deaths
Canadian centenarians
Men centenarians
War photographers
People from Prince County, Prince Edward Island
Canadian photojournalists
Artists from Prince Edward Island